Aftermath Services, a ServiceMaster company, performs crime scene clean up, homicide cleanup, suicide cleanup, hoarding cleanup, unattended death cleanup, infectious disease disinfection, and other trauma cleanup and specialty biohazard cleaning services such as hoarding and tear gas cleanup. Headquartered in Aurora, IL, the company has been in business since 1996 and maintains locations serving 48 of the United States. The company pioneered its field and was the subject of a book by the same name. The company manufactures proprietary cleaning agents engineered specifically for cleaning biomatter and bodily fluids.

Aftermath Services was acquired by ServiceMaster in April 2022.

References

Companies based in DuPage County, Illinois
Economy of Aurora, Illinois
Crime in the United States